The 2022 Torneo Internazionale Femminile Antico Tiro a Volo was a professional tennis tournament played on outdoor clay courts. It was the twelfth edition of the tournament which was part of the 2022 ITF Women's World Tennis Tour. It took place in Rome, Italy between 11 and 17 July 2022.

Champions

Singles

  Tara Würth def.  Chloé Paquet, 6–3, 6–4

Doubles

  Andrea Gámiz /  Eva Vedder def.  Estelle Cascino /  Camilla Rosatello, 7–5, 2–6, [13–11]

Singles main draw entrants

Seeds

 1 Rankings are as of 27 June 2022.

Other entrants
The following players received wildcards into the singles main draw:
  Diletta Cherubini
  Verena Meliss
  Matilde Paoletti
  Bianca Turati

The following players received entry from the qualifying draw:
  Nuria Brancaccio
  Sara Cakarevic
  Martina Di Giuseppe
  Lisa Pigato
  Andreea Prisăcariu
  Stefania Rubini
  Diana Shnaider
  Tara Würth

The following player received entry as a lucky loser:
  Angelica Raggi

References

External links
 2022 Torneo Internazionale Femminile Antico Tiro a Volo at ITFtennis.com
 Official website

2022 ITF Women's World Tennis Tour
2022 in Italian tennis
July 2022 sports events in Italy